Dawa District is a district of the city of Panjin, in central Liaoning province of Northeast China. The postal code is 124200. The district seat is located in Zhanqian Community in Dawa Town. The district was known as Dawa County until 2016, when it was converted to a district.

Administrative divisions
Dawa consists of six subdistricts and 10 towns.
Subdistricts: Rongbin Subdistrict, Erjiegou Subdistrict, Rongxing Subdistrict, Dawa Subdistrict, Tianjia Subdistrict, Yushu Subdistrict, Xianghai Subdistrict, Qianjin Subdistrict
Towns: Tianzhuangtai (Tienchwangtai), Dongfeng, Xinkai, Qingshui, Xinxing, Xi'an, Xinli, Tangjia, Ping'an Township, Zhaoquanhe

Tourism
The Red Beach, a marsh landscape famous for a sea of red plants, is in the district.

References

External links

County-level divisions of Liaoning
Panjin